Wienhausen Abbey or  Convent near Celle in Lower Saxony, Germany, is a community of Evangelical Lutheran women, which until the Reformation was a Cistercian Catholic nunnery. The abbey owns significant artworks and artifacts, including a collection of tapestries and the earliest surviving example of a type of eyeglasses.

History
The abbey was established in Wienhausen,  from the town of Celle, on the bank of the Aller, in or about 1230 by Agnes von Landsberg, daughter-in-law of Henry the Lion, Duke of Saxony and Bavaria. According to the Wienhausen town chronicle, this was the relocation of a monastic foundation made 10 years previously on a site at Nienhagen several kilometers away, which was moved because it had been built on marshland.

In 1233 the foundation of the nunnery here was officially confirmed by Konrad II of Riesenberg, bishop of Hildesheim, who transferred to the new abbey the archdeaconry church that had stood in Wienhausen since the mid 11th century, and the tithes of several villages. The nuns lived according to the Cistercian rule although it is unclear to what extent they were ever formally part of the Cistercian hierarchy.

In 1469 the abbey came under the influence of the reformist Windesheim Congregation and were obliged to tighten up their Cistercian practice; one side-effect of the reform was that the then abbess, Katharina von Hoya, was removed to another nunnery.

In the 16th century, Duke Ernest of Brunswick-Lüneburg enforced the Reformation in his duchy. Despite the opposition of the entire community, the nunnery was transformed from a Roman Catholic into a Lutheran establishment for unmarried noble women (Damenstift) in 1531, after the Duke had broken the resistance of the community by the demolition of the provostry and most of the chapels in the church, and the confiscation of the provostry property, which formed a substantial part of the abbey's income. The destroyed buildings were rebuilt 19 years later (in about 1550) as half-timbered structures. In 1587, the first officially Protestant abbess was installed, and in 1616 the community stopped wearing Cistercian habits, although it had a reputation for secret leanings to Catholicism for many years afterwards.

Architecture

Most of the historic buildings, in the style known as Brick Gothic, are well-preserved. East of the church are a water mill and the farm building. Directly north of the church and at right angles to it are the two conventual building ranges: one dates from the Middle Ages, while the one to the east is a post-Reformation half-timbered building of about 1550. Between them is a two-storey cloister, a Brick Gothic masterpiece.

The church consists of two parts: the original Romanesque 11th century church that belonged to the archdeaconry once based here, that predates the foundation of the nunnery, and originally had a tower that was demolished, in keeping with Cistercian practice, when the abbey was first established here; and a Gothic church built onto the west end of the earlier structure, which comprises the nuns' private chapel (Nonnenchor) on the upper floor and the strangers' church or pilgrims' hall (Pilgersaal) on the ground floor. The Romanesque and the Gothic parts of the building are today separated by a wooden partition wall and are used independently.

Completed in the 14th century, the nuns' chapel is remarkable even among Gothic places of worship for its intricate decorations. The ceiling and walls are completely covered with biblical images and ornaments, which portrayed, among other subjects, the Creation, and the life, death and resurrection of Jesus, and his reign in New Jerusalem. Several artifacts were discovered during a renovation in 1953, including the world's oldest preserved rivet spectacles which date back to the 14th or 15th century.

The abbey is known for its collection of Gothic tapestries from the 14th and 15th centuries. Each year following Pentecost, the tapestries are on public display. Subjects include both Christian and secular themes, e.g. the legend of Tristan and Isolde, several saints' stories (including Saints Thomas, Anne and Elizabeth), as well as the Mirror of Human Salvation. The art treasures are maintained and displayed by the members of the community.

Today, with several other women's Lutheran religious houses in the area, collectively known as the Lüneburger Klöster, Wienhausen is maintained by the Monastic Chamber of Hanover, an institution of the former Kingdom of Hanover founded by Prince-Regent George IV in 1818, in order to manage and preserve the estates of Lutheran convents on their behalf, now continued as an institution of Hanover's successor state of Lower Saxony subordinate to its Ministry/Department of Science and Culture.

Images

List of abbesses

Notes

References

External links
 Wienhausen municipal website: page on Kloster Wienhausen 
 Eyeglasses Through the Ages
 The Invention of Spectacles
 

Cistercian nunneries in Germany
Lutheran women's convents
Monasteries in Lower Saxony
Buildings and structures completed in the 13th century
1230s establishments in the Holy Roman Empire
1230 establishments in Europe
1531 establishments in the Holy Roman Empire
Lüneburg Heath
Brick Gothic
Gothic architecture in Germany